David Marsh may refer to:

Dave Marsh (born 1950), American music critic
Dave Marsh (game developer) (born 1964), American video game designer
Dave Marsh (musician) (born 1963), Canadian musician
David Marsh (cyclist) (1894–1960), who represented Great Britain at the 1920 Summer Olympics
David Marsh (financial specialist) (born 1952), British financial specialist, business consultant and writer
David Marsh (golfer) (1934–2022), British amateur golfer and chairman of Everton Football Club
David Marsh (political scientist) (born 1946), British political scientist
David Marsh (swimming coach) (born 1958), men's and women's swimming and diving coach at Auburn University